The 1973 Walker Cup, the 24th Walker Cup Match, was played on August 24 and 25, 1973, at The Country Club, Brookline, Massachusetts. The event was won by the United States 14 to 10.

Great Britain and Ireland failed to win any foursomes matches, losing six and halving the other two. In first singles session Great Britain and Ireland won five matches but needing 6½ points from the final 8 singles they could only win three, halve two while two of the lost matches went to the last hole.

Format
The format for play on Friday and Saturday was the same. There were four matches of foursomes in the morning and eight singles matches in the afternoon. In all, 24 matches were played.

Each of the 24 matches was worth one point in the larger team competition. If a match was all square after the 18th hole extra holes were not played. Rather, each side earned ½ a point toward their team total. The team that accumulated at least 12½ points won the competition. If the two teams were tied, the previous winner would retain the trophy.

Teams
Ten players for the United States and Great Britain & Ireland participated in the event plus one non-playing captain for each team.

United States

Captain: Jess Sweetser
Doug Ballenger
Danny Edwards
Jimmy Ellis
Vinny Giles
Mike Killian
Gary Koch
Mark Pfeil
Bill Rogers
Dick Siderowf
Marty West

Great Britain & Ireland
 & 
Captain:  David Marsh
 Michael Bonallack
 Howard Clark
 John Davies
 Rodney Foster
 Charlie Green
 Peter Hedges
 Trevor Homer
 Michael King
 Willie Milne
 Hugh Stuart

Friday's matches

Morning foursomes

Afternoon singles

Saturday's matches

Morning foursomes

Afternoon singles

References

Walker Cup
Walker Cup
Walker Cup
Walker Cup
Golf in Massachusetts
Events in Norfolk County, Massachusetts
Sports competitions in Massachusetts
Sports in Brookline, Massachusetts
Tourist attractions in Brookline, Massachusetts
Walker Cup